Herbert Friedrich Wilhelm Backe (1 May 1896 – 6 April 1947) was a German politician and SS Senior group leader (SS-Obergruppenführer) in Nazi Germany who served as State Secretary and Minister in the Reich Ministry of Food and Agriculture. He was a doctrinaire racial ideologue, a long-time associate of Richard Walther Darré and a personal friend of Reinhard Heydrich. He developed and implemented the Operation Hunger that envisioned death by starvation of millions of Slavic and Jewish "useless eaters" following Operation Barbarossa, the 1941 invasion of the Soviet Union.

Operation Hunger was developed during the planning phase of Operation Barbarossa and provided for diverting and redirecting of Ukrainian food stuffs away from central and northern Russia for the benefit of the invading army and the population in Germany. As a result, millions of local civilians died in the German-occupied territories. He was arrested in 1945 at the end of World War II and was due to be tried for war crimes at Nuremberg in the Ministries Trial but he committed suicide in his prison cell in 1947.

Biography
Herbert Backe was born in Batumi, Georgia, the son of a retired Prussian lieutenant turned trader. His mother was a Caucasus German, whose family had emigrated from Württemberg to Russia in the early 19th century. He studied at the Tbilisi gymnasium (grammar school) from 1905 and was interned on the outbreak of World War I as an enemy alien because he was a citizen of Prussia. This experience of being imprisoned for being German and witnessing the beginning of the Russian Revolution made Backe an anti-communist.

Backe moved to Germany during the Russian Civil War with the help of the Swedish Red Cross. In Germany, he initially worked as a labourer, and enrolled to study Agronomy at the University of Göttingen in 1920. After completing his degree he briefly worked in agriculture and then became an assistant lecturer on agricultural geography at Hanover Technical University. In 1926, he submitted his doctoral dissertation to the University of Göttingen, but it was rejected. "Backe's thesis was in fact a manifesto for racial imperialism", where an upper class of German occupiers would fight against the local, 'ethnically inferior', population for the control of their food stuff.

Backe joined the SA in 1922 and in 1925 in Hanover the Nazi Party. After the dissolution of the regional political entity (Gau) for South-Hanover, Backe let his membership expire.
In 1927 Backe was inspector and administrator on a big farm in Pommern. In 1928 he was married to Ursula. With financial support of his father-in-law, in November 1928 he became tenant of domain Hornsen, with around 950 acres in the district of Alfeld. He proceeded to lead the farm successfully. After the Nazi seizure of power, Backe became the State Secretary in the Reich Ministry of Food and Agriculture on 27 October 1933, and in the same month he joined the SS. Backe became a member of the Prussian State Council and, in October 1936, he was made the agricultural representative to Hermann Göring's Four Year Plan. When the minister of Food and Agriculture Richard Walther Darré was placed on an extended leave of absence on 23 May 1942, Backe was charged with carrying out his responsibilities, though nominally remaining State Secretary. Backe also was charged with Darré's responsibilities as Reich Farmers Leader in the Nazi Party national leadership. On 9 November 1942, Backe was promoted to SS-Senior Group Leader (SS-Obergruppenführer). On 6 April 1944, Hitler finally named Backe minister of the Reich Ministry of Food and Agriculture.

Backe was a prominent member of the younger generation of Nazi technocrats who occupied second-tier administrative positions in the Nazi system such as Reinhard Heydrich, Werner Best, and Wilhelm Stuckart. Like Stuckart, who held the real power in the Interior Ministry (officially led by Wilhelm Frick) and Wilhelm Ohnesorge in the Reich Postal Ministry (officially led by the conservative Paul Eltz-Rübenach), Backe was the de facto Minister of Food and Agriculture under Darré, even before he formally took over those duties.

Hunger Plan

Backe was nominated by the Reich Minister for the Occupied Eastern Territories, Alfred Rosenberg, as the Secretary of State of the Reichskommissariat Ukraine where he could implement his radical and racist policies, the Hunger Plan (Der Hungerplan also Der Backe-Plan). Its objective was to inflict deliberate mass starvation on the Slavic civilian populations under German occupation by directing all food supplies to the German home population and the German Armed forces on the Eastern Front. The most important accomplice of Herbert Backe was Hans-Joachim Riecke, who headed the agricultural section of the Economic Staff East. According to the historian Timothy Snyder, as a result of Backe's plan, "4.2 million Soviet citizens (largely Russians, Belarusians, and Ukrainians) were starved by the German occupiers in 1941–1944".

Arrest and suicide 
Backe was retained as Reichsminister of Food and Agriculture in Hitler's will and he remained in this position until 23 May 1945 in the short-lived Flensburg Government led by Grossadmiral Karl Dönitz. After the German Instrument of Surrender, Backe was ordered by the allies, together with Dorpmüller, to fly to Eisenhower's headquarters in Reims. He was surprised to be arrested; he thought the Americans would need him as an expert to avoid hunger problems. Backe prepared himself for an expected conversation with General Dwight D. Eisenhower. In a letter to his wife on 31 January 1946, he defended Nazism as one of the "greatest ideas of all times", which "found its strongest blow in the National Socialist agricultural policy".

In allied captivity, Backe was interrogated during the Nuremberg trials of 21 February and 14 March 1947. In his prison cell in the Nuremberg war criminals' prison, Backe wrote two treatises: a so-called big report about his life and his work on Nazism, and also on 31 January 1946, a testament outline for his wife Ursula and his four children. Because of his fear that he was to be delivered to the Soviet Union, he committed suicide by hanging himself in his prison cell on 6 April 1947.

See also
 	
 List of people who died by suicide by hanging

Notes

References

Bibliography

 
  
  
Snyder, Timothy. Bloodlands: Europe Between Hitler and Stalin. London: The Bodley Head, 2010. .
 

 Zentner, Christian and Friedemann Bedürftig. The Encyclopedia of the Third Reich. New York: Macmillan, 1991. .

External links
 
 

1896 births
1947 deaths
1947 suicides
Agriculture ministers of Germany
German agronomists
Holocaust perpetrators
Nazi Germany ministers
Nazi Party officials
Nazi Party politicians
Nazis who committed suicide in Germany
Nazis who committed suicide in prison custody
People from Batumi
People from Kutais Governorate
Sturmabteilung personnel
SS-Obergruppenführer
Suicides by hanging in Germany
University of Göttingen alumni
Academic staff of the University of Hanover
Prisoners who died in United States military detention
20th-century agronomists